Metatactis is a genus of moth in the family Gelechiidae. It has a single species, Metatactis griseobrunnea. Both the genus and species were described by Dr. Antonius J. T. Janse in 1949. The species is found in Namibia.

References

Chelariini